Developmental Dynamics is a peer-reviewed scientific journal of developmental biology that was established in 1901 as the American Journal of Anatomy. It obtained its current name in 1992 and is one of three official journals of the American Association of Anatomists. The journal is published monthly by John Wiley & Sons.

According to the Journal Citation Reports, the journal has a 2020 impact factor of 3.780, ranking it 2nd out of 21 journals in the category "Anatomy & Morphology" and 14th out of 41 journals in the category "Developmental Biology".

Abstracting and indexing 
The journal is indexed and abstracted in:

References

External links
Developmental Dynamics website
Association for Anatomy website

Developmental biology journals
Publications established in 1901
Monthly journals
Wiley (publisher) academic journals
English-language journals
Academic journals associated with learned and professional societies